Dontrelle is a given name. Notable people with the name include:

 Dontrelle Inman (born 1989), American football player
 Dontrelle Willis (born 1982), American baseball player

See also
 Dantrell
 Dontrell

Masculine given names